Dealing: Or the Berkeley-to-Boston Forty-Brick Lost-Bag Blues is a 1972 film based on the 1970 novel of the same name by Michael Crichton and Douglas Crichton, published under the pseudonym Michael Douglas.

It was American independent film directed by Paul Williams and starred Robert F. Lyons and John Lithgow in his film debut in the supporting role of John, the campus drug dealer. Barbara Hershey appears in the role of the novice drug courier, Susan, who loses the bag of bricks on a cross-country flight from Berkeley to Boston.

Plot
Peter is a cocky Harvard law student, who is tired of being square, so his best friend and theater director John gets him into the drug business. Peter loves the excitement of the gig and agrees to transport a suitcase full of pot from his suppliers to him. As a fan of the Rolling Stones' song Sympathy for the Devil, he picks Lucifer as his street name.

At the drug dealers' hideout, Peter meets Susan and falls for her hard, since she is the complete opposite of his somewhat prudish and stuck up square girlfriend Annie. Susan likes him too and agrees to take him to a train station to hide the dope in one of the lockers there. They hit it off quickly. When they arrive at the station they notice a military officer, who is overseeing a funeral transport for what seems to be a casket of a dead soldier from the Vietnam War. This sight gives the two cold feet, so they leave to spend a night together at one of her musician friends' place.

Peter then completes the job but soon asks John for another gig, since he really wants to see Susan again. However, the gig goes sour this time and the girl is busted with forty bricks (or kilos) of marijuana by police sergeant Murphy, who happens to be a dirty cop in bed with Cortez, a dangerous Cuban gangster. John wants his dope back and Peter wants to save Susan, so they come up with a risky plan that eventually involves a round metal casing full of red heroin which everyone wants and is glad to kill for.

Cast
Robert F. Lyons as Peter
Barbara Hershey as Susan
John Lithgow as John
Charles Durning as Lt. Murphy
Joy Bang as Sandra
Ellen Barber as Annie
Paul Sorvino as Taxi Driver
Demond Wilson as Rupert
Gene Borkan as Musty
Buzzy Linhart as Buzzy
Paul Williams as Barry
Victor Junquera as Cortez
Howard Gardner as Lecturer
Nancy Belle Fuller as Avis Girl
Herbert Kerr as Emir
Ted Williams as Receptionist
Anitra Walsh as Townie Girl
Tom Harvey as Captain Fry
Victor Argo as 2nd Cuban
Hector Elias as 3rd Cuban

Production
Film rights were bought in 1970. Filming took place in San Francisco and Boston

Reception
The Washington Post called it "a rather feckless attempt at a hip thriller".

See also
 List of American films of 1972

References

External links
 
 

1972 films
1970s road comedy-drama films
1970s crime thriller films
American road comedy-drama films
American crime thriller films
Films about drugs
Films about the illegal drug trade
Films based on American novels
Films based on thriller novels
Films based on works by Michael Crichton
Films directed by Paul Williams
Films set in Massachusetts
Films shot in Massachusetts
Warner Bros. films
Films scored by Michael Small
1972 comedy films
1972 drama films
1970s English-language films
Films with screenplays by David Odell
1970s American films